"Don't You Turn Your Back on Me" is the fourth single by Guano Apes. It was released to promote the film Meschugge in 1999. Despite the video's heavy rotation on various music channels, the single charted in their native Germany at number 50, which is one of the reasons the song was not included in their 2000 album Don't Give Me Names. The music video marked a new look for lead singer Sandra, who dyed her blonde hair jet black.

Track listing

CD single
Don't You Turn Your Back On Me (Original) - 3:46
Don't You Turn Your Back On Me (Frozen-Mix) - 4:05
Don't You Turn Your Back On Me (String-Version) - 3:57
Don't You Turn Your Back On Me (Prince P.A.L.-Clubmix) - 3:46
Move A Little Closer - 2:48
Multimedia Track (CD-ROM only, contains multimedia part for PC and Mac with title track video, pictures, discography, film trailer and internet links. Music video remains exclusive for this single, as it contains excerpts from the film Meschugge, and is unavailable on any other band's releases.)

Chart positions

References

1999 songs
Rock ballads
Guano Apes songs